Zeta Normae, Latinised from ζ Normae, is a solitary, yellow-white hued star in the southern constellation of Norma. With an apparent visual magnitude of 5.81, it is a dim star near the lower limit of visibility for the naked eye. It is advancing in the general direction of the Sun with a radial velocity of −45.6 km/s.

This is an evolved F-type giant  star with a stellar classification of F2 III that has swollen and cooled off the main sequence after consuming the hydrogen at its core. It is an estimated 1.5 billion years old with 1.74 times the mass of the Sun and 3.2 times the Sun's radius. Zeta Normae is radiating approximately 19 times the Sun's luminosity from its photosphere at an effective temperature of 6,743 K.

References

F-type giants
Norma (constellation)
Normae, Zeta
Durchmusterung objects
145361
079497
6019